Adolphe Low (21 July 1915, at Cottbus – 11 November 2012, at Strasbourg) was a German-French politician.

Low was a member of the International Brigades that fought in the Spanish civil war and a combatant with the  French resistance movement Résistance.

Literature 

 Adolphe Low: Mein Weg nach Spanien. In: „informationen“ Studienkreis Deutscher Widerstand 1933–1945 e. V., Heft 49, Mai 1999.

References

External links
 Volltext

1915 births
2012 deaths
People from Cottbus
People from the Province of Brandenburg
Jewish emigrants from Nazi Germany to France 
German communists
International Brigades personnel
Members of the Francs-tireurs et partisans
Chevaliers of the Légion d'honneur